The Barbados National Honours and Decorations system is similar to that of the United Kingdom. Likewise, it consists of three types of award – honours, decorations and medals. Appointments are made on a yearly basis on Independence Day by the president of Barbados.

Before the transition to a parliamentary republican system, Barbadians were conferred honours in the British honours system as well until recently. This ceased with the creation of the Republic of Barbados and the replacement of the positions of Queen of Barbados and Governor-General of Barbados with the position of President of Barbados as head of state.

Appointments of Knights and Dames of St. Andrew have also ceased.

Structure

Orders of merit 
 Order of National Heroes
 Within the Order of Barbados:
 Order of Freedom of Barbados
 Order of the Republic

Decorations and awards 
 Being part of the Order of Barbados:
 Gold Award of Achievement
 Trident of Excellence
 Barbados Service Award
 Barbados Services Medal of Honour
 Barbados Humanitarian Service Award
 Award of Pride of Barbados
 Prime Minister’s Award for Leadership
 Barbados Bravery Decorations:
 Barbados Star of Gallantry
 Barbados Bravery Medal

Miscellaneous 
 Barbados Jubilee Honour
 Barbados Centennial Honour

Former decorations and awards
 Within the Order of Barbados:
Knight or Dame of St Andrew
Companion of Honour of Barbados
Crown of Merit

Style 

Knights and Dames of St Andrew within the former Order of Barbados of the Kingdom of Barbados attach Sir or Dame before their names, and use their corresponding post-nominals after their name, e.g. Sir John Smith, KA, or Dame Jane Smith, DA.

Members of the Order of National Heroes are referred to as "National Hero", and are accorded the style The Right Excellent. 

Recipients of the Order of Freedom of Barbados receive the style The Most Honourable, and they also use their corresponding post-nominal "FB".

Companions of Honour of the former Order of Barbados of the Kingdom of Barbados, as well Members of the current Order of the Republic, are accorded the style The Honourable, and with respectively the post-nominals "CHB" or "OR".

Recipients of the other decorations and awards do not receive a style, but they may attach the according postnominal letters to their name, e.g., John Smith, BSS.

References 

Barbados and the Commonwealth of Nations
Orders, decorations, and medals of Barbados